Major James Leith  (26 May 1826 – 13 May 1869) was a Scottish recipient of the Victoria Cross, the highest and most prestigious award for gallantry in the face of the enemy that can be awarded to British and Commonwealth forces.

Life
James Leith was the son of General Alexander Leith of Freefield and Glenkindie, Aberdeenshire and educated at Blackheath Proprietary School and Trinity College, Cambridge. He played cricket for Cambridge University from 1846 to 1849.

Leith was 31 years old, and a lieutenant in the 14th Light Dragoons (later 14th Hussars (The King's)), British Army during the Indian Mutiny when, on 1 April 1858 at Betwa, India, the following deed led to his being awarded the Victoria Cross:

The medal is currently displayed at the 14th/20th King's Hussars gallery of the Museum of Lancashire, Preston, Lancashire.

He was appointed to the Honourable Corps of Gentlemen at Arms in 1868.

References

Monuments to Courage (David Harvey, 1999)
The Register of the Victoria Cross (This England, 1997)
Scotland's Forgotten Valour (Graham Ross, 1995)

External links
Location of grave and VC medal (Grampian)

1826 births
1869 deaths
People from Marr
People educated at Blackheath Proprietary School
British recipients of the Victoria Cross
Indian Rebellion of 1857 recipients of the Victoria Cross
14th King's Hussars officers
Alumni of Trinity College, Cambridge
Cambridge University cricketers
British military personnel of the Anglo-Persian War
Honourable Corps of Gentlemen at Arms
Royal Scots Greys officers
British Army recipients of the Victoria Cross
Military personnel from Aberdeenshire
Burials in Aberdeenshire